Woodnesborough railway station was a railway station on the East Kent Light Railway. It opened on 16 October 1916 and closed to passenger traffic after the last train on 30 October 1948. The station served the village of Woodnesborough. There was a 500-gallon water tank and a siding. A half mile long branch served Hammill Brick Works, built on the site of the aborted Hammill Colliery. Today the station site is now covered by industrial buildings.

References

Sources
 

Disused railway stations in Kent
Former East Kent Light Railway stations
Railway stations in Great Britain opened in 1916
Railway stations in Great Britain closed in 1948